Ror is a caste found primarily in the Indian state of Haryana. It is classified as a forward caste. In terms of social status, it is considered equivalent to Jat as both the groups are primarily involved in cultivation.

Occupation and culture
As of a 1990 report by the Government of Haryana, they were mostly engaged in farming, with some practicing animal husbandry.

Located at Karnal, the Ror Mahasabha functions to bring about social reforms. Rors are traditional-Hindus by religion. Holi and Diwali are the major festivals celebrated.

Notable people
 Manoj Kumar, boxer
 Neeraj Chopra, Track and field athlete

References

Social groups of Haryana
Indian castes
Agricultural castes